"Bazaar of the Bizarre" is a sword and sorcery novelette by American writer Fritz Leiber and part of the canon of stories chronicling  Fafhrd and the Gray Mouser.

First published in 1963 in Fantastic, it has been reprinted several times, including as a standalone edition. It also appears in the anthology The Spell of Seven, edited by L. Sprague de Camp.

Plot
One night in Lankhmar, the wizards Ningauble of the Seven Eyes and Sheelba of the Eyeless Face join forces and summon Fafhrd and the Gray Mouser to carry out a mission. They are required to enter the Plaza of Dark Delights and obliterate an illegal bazaar established there by the Devourers, alien merchants who magically mesmerize customers into buying high priced merchandise which is actually worthless junk. However, Mouser arrives before him and is enticed into the bazaar. Fafhrd, aided only by the Blindfold of True Seeing and Cloak of Invisibility, given to him by the wizards, must perform the mission alone.

This he does, battling not only an entranced Mouser, but reanimated skeletons and living statues as well, against which his weapons are all but useless. Fortunately, he manages to escape and rescue Mouser, who's still mesmerized into believing that the junk he sees is actually valuable, including books of ancient spells.

References

External links 

 

1963 short stories
Fantasy short stories
Short stories by Fritz Leiber
Nehwon
Novelettes
Works originally published in Fantastic (magazine)